The Lithuania women's national ice hockey team is the women's national ice hockey team in Lithuania. As of April 2020, they are ranked 40th in the IIHF world rankings. The team is a new addition to Division III, joining for the 2020 Women's World Championship tournament. On 4 December 2019, they won their first game against Hong Kong, China, by a score of 4–2. They subsequently defeated Belgium by a score of 4–3. In their final game of the tournament, they lost to South Africa 4–2. 

Forward Klara Miuller is the team's scoring leader, with 9 goals and one assist in the opening tournament. Ramune Maleckiené is the team captain.  Bernd Haake, from Germany, is the team's head coach. He is well known in Lituania for his contribution to the development of the sport in the country.   

Lithuania has been chosen to host the 2021 Women's World Championship, Division III.

World Championships record
2020 – Finished in 39th place (5th in Division III)
2021 – Cancelled due to the COVID-19 pandemic
2022 – Finished in 33rd place (2nd in Division IIIA)

Baltic Cup
2023:

References

External links

IIHF profile
National Teams of Ice Hockey

Ice hockey in Lithuania
Ice hockey
Women's national ice hockey teams in Europe